|}

The Prix Matchem is a Listed flat horse race in France open to three-year-old thoroughbred colts and geldings. It is run at Maisons-Laffitte over a distance of 1,800 metres (1⅛ miles), and it is scheduled to take place each year in May or June.

History
The event was established in 1931, and it was originally held at Le Tremblay. It was initially the second leg of a two-part series called the Prix Biennal Herod-Matchem. The first leg, for two-year-olds, was the Prix Herod. The two parts were named after Herod and Matchem, foundation sires in the 18th century.

The Prix Matchem was transferred to Évry in the 1970s. For a period it took place in April or May, and its regular distance was 1,800 metres. It was cut to 1,600 metres in 1986, and restored to its previous length in 1990.

The race was switched to Chantilly in 1997, and to Maisons-Laffitte the following year. It began a longer spell at Chantilly in 1999, and returned to Maisons-Laffitte in 2002. It was extended to 2,100 metres in 2005, and from this point it was staged in late May or early June.

The Prix Matchem was contested over 2,000 metres at Compiègne in 2006 and 2007. It was run over 1,800 metres at Maisons-Laffitte in 2008, and over 2,000 metres at Saint-Cloud from 2009 to 2011. It reverted to 1,800 metres at Maisons-Laffitte in 2012.

Records
Leading jockey since 1979 (7 wins):
 Olivier Peslier – Le Balafre (1993), Martiniquais (1996), Val Royal (1999), Vahorimix (2001), Thattinger (2002), Pilote (2013), Matematica (2019)

Leading trainer since 1979 (13 wins):
 André Fabre – Kitwood (1992), Bobinski (1995), Martiniquais (1996), Visionary (1997), Val Royal (1999), Vahorimix (2001), Kiddy Sing (2003), Valixir (2004), Kocab (2005), Russian Desert (2007), Cavalryman (2009), Pilote (2013), Alson (2020)

Leading owner since 1979 (4 wins):
 Jean-Luc Lagardère – Alzao (1983), Visionary (1997), Val Royal (1999), Vahorimix (2001)
 HH Aga Khan IV - Mourtazam (1981), Dilek (2006), Valiyr (2011), Rickfield (2015)

Winners since 1979

Earlier winners

 1931: Pulcherrimus
 1932: Laeken
 1933: Scolopax
 1934: Antiochus
 1935: Ipe
 1936: Petit Jean
 1937: Clairvoyant
 1938: Castel Fusano
 1939: Etalon Or
 1947: Pearl Diver
 1962: Violon d'Ingres
 1963: Montsoreau
 1974: Caracolero
 1976: Exceller
 1978: Dom Racine
</div>

See also
 List of French flat horse races

References

 France Galop / Racing Post:
 , 

 pedigreequery.com – Prix Matchem.

Flat horse races for three-year-olds
Maisons-Laffitte Racecourse
Horse races in France
Recurring sporting events established in 1931
1931 establishments in France